Derek Decamps aka Derek (born 2 May 1985) is a French footballer who plays as a centre-back in the Norwegian Tippeligaen for Sandnes Ulf.

Career 
Born in Paris, France, Decamps began playing football with AS Cannes, and moved to Greece to play for Aris Thessaloniki F.C. and PAS Giannina F.C. in the Greek Superleague.

He moved to Spain and played for Lorca Deportiva CF and AD Alcorcón in the Spanish Segunda División B.

On 15 August 2009, the 24-year-old French defender left his Spanish club Santa Eulàlia of the Spanish Segunda División B to join South African side Ajax Cape Town. In the 2010–11 season he played a big part in Ajax's successful league campaign in which Ajax finished 2nd after only managing a draw in the last home game. A win would have won the championship for the Cape Town side.

On 27 June 2011, the Norwegian club FK Haugesund announced that they had signed Decamps on a one-year contract. After one year Decamps was a regular starter for Haugesund in Tippeligaen, and the club wanted to renew his contract, but Decamps chose to move home to his family in France when his contract expired on 31 July 2012. In August 2013 he signed a loan contract with Sarpsborg 08 for the season.

In January 2014 he returned to the Tippeligaen joining Sandnes Ulf.

References

External links
 
 Video album on Vimeo

1985 births
Living people
French footballers
AS Cannes players
Aris Thessaloniki F.C. players
PAS Giannina F.C. players
Lorca Deportiva CF footballers
AD Alcorcón footballers
Cape Town Spurs F.C. players
FK Haugesund players
Sarpsborg 08 FF players
Sandnes Ulf players
Eliteserien players
Norwegian First Division players
French expatriate footballers
Expatriate footballers in Spain
French expatriate sportspeople in Spain
Expatriate soccer players in South Africa
French expatriate sportspeople in South Africa
Expatriate footballers in Norway
French expatriate sportspeople in Norway
Association football central defenders